Callitris endlicheri, commonly known as the black cypress pine, is a species of conifer in the family Cupressaceae. It is found only in Australia, occurring in Queensland, New South Wales, the Australian Capital Territory, and Victoria.

Description
Callitris endlicheri is an evergreen tree growing 5-15 meters tall with tough, furrowed bark. The branches may be erect or spreading with keeled green leaves measuring 2-4 millimeters long. This species is monoecious, with female cones occurring solitarily or in clusters on slender fruiting branchlets. The cones are smooth, almost spherical, measuring 15-20mm in diameter and containing a number of sticky seeds coated in resin. Cones may persist on the tree for a number of years.

Human uses
The Wiradjuri people of New South Wales, who use the name kara to refer to this species, use the trunks of young trees to make spears, the wood and dry needles as kindling, and the resinous sap as a glue and medicine. It is sometimes logged for commercial purposes.

See also
Pine Island Reserve

References

Flora of New South Wales
Flora of Queensland
Flora of Victoria (Australia)
Flora of the Australian Capital Territory
endlicheri
Trees of Australia
Pinales of Australia
Trees of mild maritime climate
Least concern flora of Australia
Least concern biota of Queensland
Taxonomy articles created by Polbot